The SOUNDPONY is a bar located in the Tulsa Arts District of downtown Tulsa, Oklahoma. The venue hosts live music, and sponsors cycling and other sporting events. It is located two doors down from Cain's Ballroom, 3 blocks from the Brady Theater, and 0.5 mi from the BOk center arena.

Owned by Mike Wozniak and Josh Gifford, the bar was one of the first businesses, along with Caz's and McNellie's, to initiate the revitalization of Tulsa's downtown nightlife in the mid-2000s. It was selected best venue for original live music from Urban Tulsa's “Best of Tulsa” in 2008, 2009, 2010, and 2011, and the club has been featured in issues of Southern Living, Spin, Reuters, and the China Shop blog.

Features
Located at 409 N. Main St. in Tulsa, The SOUNDPONY is open, as its door says, at “3-ish” until close around 2am. It sports a shot-gun style layout of 1500 sq feet, not including a back outdoor patio with a view of the Tulsa skyline. Featuring a full bar, the bar also carries Marshall (Tulsa), Coop (OKC), and Boulevard (KC) beers on tap, a large bottled beer selection, darts, retro video games, and a turntable and mic behind the bar, which is used for Tuesday's trivia night. Sometimes the bar facilitates consignment bike sales.

History
Mike Wozniak and Josh Gifford met in Norman where they worked at Chili's circa 1994. After both moving to Tulsa, they bartendered together at Empire Bar and the Brook, where they aspired to have their own establishment so that they could have a venue for their own creative endeavors in music and video. Eventually, they started a company called Creative Juices that made wedding videos and art.

To finance the bar, they took out personal lines of credit that were secured by Josh's life insurance policy and Mike's house. Doug DeJarnette at Bank of Oklahoma handled the financing. Contractor Mickey Payne found the space near Cain's, noting it would be a good spot because the ticket line from Cain's often stretches past the space that was to become the bar.

Once money and name were in place, Mike and Josh enlisted the help of Duvall Architects (the firm that also designed Vintage 1740 and the Dust Bowl in Tulsa) and contractor Mickey Payne of Happy Hammer, along with Roger Condray welder who did much of the bar's fixtures and signs. Artist Anne-Marie Foy did the iconic SOUNDPONY moss sign inside the bar.

In addition to the short-lived band, the SOUNDPONY race team existed before the bar, though they were incorporated in July, 2005.

The Bar opened May 2006 and tends to attract a diverse and varied crowd. As Mike states, “The bar has changed and evolved over time in a very organic way. Just like we envisioned.”

The Name
People often wonder how the bar got its name. One year when Mike was in Vail, he called Josh who was at the moment playing music with a band back in Tulsa. Someone yelled out, “We are the fabulous SOUNDPONY.” Eventually, drawing on the myth, the word got tied to the idea of a good horse, riding, racing, and then bikes, any form of alternate transportation. As Josh put it, “Legend has it that Johnny Rotten, Miles Davis, Charlie Parker, James Earl Jones, Conan, Bob Newhart, and a horse had an orgy and out blasted the SOUNDPONY.”

Sponsorships and enthusiasts
The SOUNDPONY is known for sponsoring cycling, art, music. Bands that have performed at the Pony include Marbin, Pontiak, Klondike 5, Sweet Baby Jaysus, The Eastern Sea and Oilhouse. The bar's music consists of everything from Soul and Punk to DJs, Jazz, and Hip-Hop. but it is best known for its indie music scene.

Athletes like Floyd Landis, Brad Huff, and Ivan Stevic, along with musicians like Dan Auerbach and Patrick Carney of the Black Keys and Georgia Hubley, Ira Kaplan, James McNew of Yo La Tengo, can regularly be seen at the Pony after events and shows.

References

External links
 Official SOUNDPONY site
 SOUNDPONY Facebook page
 SOUNDPONY Myspace page

Nightclubs in the United States
Companies based in Tulsa, Oklahoma